Nick Kyrgios defeated Matt Reid 6–3, 6–2 in the final to win the title.

Seeds

Draw

Finals

Top half

Bottom half

References 
 Main Draw
 Qualifying Draw

Men's Singles
2013 Men's Singles
Nature's Way